This is a list of released video and PC games that are developed in Hong Kong (香港制作的遊戲).

References 

Video games developed in China
Hong Kong
Video games in Hong Kong
Entertainment in Hong Kong